The 1957 Boston Red Sox season was the 57th season in the franchise's Major League Baseball history. The Red Sox finished third in the American League (AL) with a record of 82 wins and 72 losses, 16 games behind the New York Yankees.

Offseason 
 December 3, 1956: Bob Smith was drafted from the Red Sox by the St. Louis Cardinals in the 1956 rule 5 draft.

Regular season

Season standings

Record vs. opponents

Opening Day lineup

Notable transactions 
 April 29, 1957: Faye Throneberry, Milt Bolling and Russ Kemmerer were traded by the Red Sox to the Washington Senators for Bob Chakales and Dean Stone.

Roster

Player stats

Batting

Starters by position 
Note: Pos = Position; G = Games played; AB = At bats; H = Hits; Avg. = Batting average; HR = Home runs; RBI = Runs batted in

Other batters 
Note: G = Games played; AB = At bats; H = Hits; Avg. = Batting average; HR = Home runs; RBI = Runs batted in

Pitching

Starting pitchers 
Note: G = Games pitched; IP = Innings pitched; W = Wins; L = Losses; ERA = Earned run average; SO = Strikeouts

Other pitchers 
Note: G = Games pitched; IP = Innings pitched; W = Wins; L = Losses; ERA = Earned run average; SO = Strikeouts

Relief pitchers 
Note: G = Games pitched; W = Wins; L = Losses; SV = Saves; ERA = Earned run average; SO = Strikeouts

Awards and honors 
 Ted Williams, Associated Press Athlete of the Year

Farm system 

LEAGUE CHAMPIONS: San Francisco

Source:

References

External links
1957 Boston Red Sox team at Baseball-Reference
1957 Boston Red Sox season at baseball-almanac.com

Boston Red Sox seasons
Boston Red Sox
Boston Red Sox
1950s in Boston